The blistered pyrgomorph (Monistria pustulifera) is a species of wingless grasshopper of the family Pyrgomorphidae, endemic to Australia.

The species is most commonly found on desert fuchsia plants of the genus Eremophila, in particular Eremophila gilesii. It is also known to attack garden plants such as Buddleja, dahlias, honeysuckle and privet.

References

External links 
 Monistria pustulifera in the Australian Faunal Directory

Pyrgomorphidae
Endemic fauna of Australia
Orthoptera of Australia
Insects described in 1871